Ewoks – Original Soundtrack is the film score to the television films Caravan of Courage: An Ewok Adventure and Ewoks: The Battle for Endor composed by Peter Bernstein. The score also includes brief reprisals of John Williams' Ewok theme from Return of the Jedi. A soundtrack album containing Bernstein's music from both films was officially released as a 12-inch LP record by Varèse Sarabande on December 8, 1986.

Overview 
At the request of George Lucas, Dorothée recorded a theme song entitled "Les petits Ewoks" (Little Ewoks) for the French release of Caravan of Courage.

The LP was later bootlegged onto CD in 1999 and retitled Star Wars: Ewoks. The bootleg has a number of discrepancies including an incorrect track arrangement, incorrect track names, and incorrect track times. Tracks labeled as "Additional Material" on the bootleg were never officially sanctioned by Lucasfilm and are in fact made up of music assembled from various releases of the Return of the Jedi soundtrack.

Reception 
The musical score has received mixed reviews. In a review specifically regarding Caravan of Courage, John J. O'Connor of The New York Times praised Bernstein's score in "transforming rather ordinary scenes into settings of foreboding". In a retrospective review of the soundtrack album, Seth Cole of Film Divider said, "There are heroic fanfares and marches reminiscent of those heard in Return of the Jedi, and definite hints of Williams-like string ostinatos as heard in the saga episodes, but the music fails to lift off in the same way."

Track listing

Personnel 
Credits adopted from liner notes:

 Peter Bernstein – composer, conductor, producer
 Richard Kraft – producer
 Tom Null – executive producer
 Christopher Palmer – orchestration
 Harry Rabinowitz – conductor (Caravan of Courage)
 Michele Stone – mastering engineer
 Jim Limbean – matrix
 Ric Hancock – matrix
 Karen Stone – production coordinator
 The Munich Philharmonic Orchestra – orchestra

Additional music 
Additional music featured in Caravan of Courage and The Battle for Endor:

References 

1986 soundtrack albums
Science fiction film soundtracks
Star Wars film soundtracks
Varèse Sarabande soundtracks